Count 'Em 88 is an album by American jazz pianist Ahmad Jamal. It contains performances recorded in 1956 and released on the Argo label.

Critical reception
Scott Yanow of AllMusic states: "The 'Jamal sound,' with its expert use of dynamics, close interplay, space and subtle surprises was very much in place, and this out-of-print set is on the same level as his better-known hits to come."

Track listing
All compositions by Ahmad Jamal unless noted.
 "Volga Boatmen" (Traditional) – 3:49 
 "On Green Dolphin Street" (Bronisław Kaper, Ned Washington) – 3:18 
 "How About You?" (Burton Lane, Ralph Freed) – 5:26 
 "I Just Can't See for Looking" (Nadine Robinson, Dok Stanford) – 2:04 
 "Spring Will Be a Little Late This Year" (Frank Loesser) – 2:34 
 "Beat Out One" – 5:24 
 "Maryam" – 3:36 
 "It's Easy to Remember" (Lorenz Hart, Richard Rodgers) – 5:35 
 "Jim Love Sue" – 2:54

Personnel
Ahmad Jamal – piano
Israel Crosby – bass
Walter Perkins – drums

References 

Argo Records albums
Ahmad Jamal albums
1956 albums
Albums produced by Phil Chess